Eupithecia deverrata is a moth in the family Geometridae. It is found from Morocco to Lebanon.

The wingspan is about 17.5 mm. The forewings are pale yellowish grey with brownish crosslines. The hindwings are of the same colour, mottled and irrorated with dark brown scales.

Subspecies
Eupithecia deverrata deverrata
Eupithecia deverrata lecerfi Prout, 1928 (Morocco)
Eupithecia deverrata prouti Zerny, 1933 (Lebanon)

References

Moths described in 1910
deverrata
Moths of Africa
Moths of Asia